Jackie Jenkins may refer to:

 Jackie 'Butch' Jenkins (1937–2001), American actor
 Jackie Jenkins-Scott (born c. 1950), American business & academic administrator
 Jackie Jenkins (fl. 1990s), British writer a.k.a. Vanessa Bishop

See also
 Jack Jenkins (disambiguation)
 John Jenkins (disambiguation)